Gil Evans Live at the Royal Festival Hall London 1978 is a live album by jazz composer, arranger, conductor and pianist Gil Evans recorded in London in 1978 by Evans with an orchestra featuring Arthur Blythe, George Adams, and Lew Soloff and released on RCA label.

Reception
Allmusic awarded the album 2 stars.

Track listing
All compositions by Gil Evans except as indicated
 "Angel" (Jimi Hendrix) - 5:05
 "Parabola" (Alan Shorter) - 6:45
 "Orange Was The Colour of Her Dress then Silk Blue" (Charles Mingus) - 7:00
 "Stone Free" (Hendrix) - 10:20
 "Fugue from Concorde" (John Lewis) - 8:30
 "Blues Inc. Medley: Cheryl/Birdhead/Relaxing at Camarillo" (Charlie Parker) 
 "Epilogue"

Personnel
Gil Evans - piano, electric piano, arranger, conductor
Lew Soloff - trumpet, piccolo trumpet  
Ernie Royal - trumpet, flugelhorn  
Hannibal Marvin Peterson - trumpet, orchestra chimes  
John Clark - French horn, guitar  
Bob Stewart - tuba, flugelhorn 
Arthur Blythe - alto saxophone, soprano saxophone
George Adams - tenor saxophone, soprano saxophone, bass clarinet, alto flute
David Sanborn - alto saxophone, soprano saxophone, flute
Pete Levin - Minimoog, clavinet 
Masabumi Kikuchi - electric organ 
Herb Bushler - bass  
Sue Evans - drums, timpani, percussion

References 

1979 live albums
Gil Evans live albums
Albums arranged by Gil Evans
RCA Records live albums